Greenhill   is an unincorporated rural community in the Canadian province of Nova Scotia, located in  Pictou County.

References
Greenhill on Destination Nova Scotia

Communities in Pictou County
General Service Areas in Nova Scotia